Hsaung Wutyee May (born 17 October 1995) is a Burmese television and film actress. She is best known for her roles in several MRTV-4 series and become popular among the audience with the series Wit Nyin Shite Than (2015), Winkabar San Eain (2015), A Mone Mha The (2017) and Where There is Love (2018).

Early life and education
Hsaung Wutyee May was born on 17 October 1995 in Yangon, Myanmar to parents Myint Thein and Nyo Nyo Win. She is the youngest daughter of two. She attended high school at BEHS 2 Bahan. She studied at West Yangon Technological University  (A.G.T.I), majoring in Electronic Communication Engineering.  She currently studying in Physics at University of Distance Education, Yangon.

Career
She started her career from the competing in Miss Lapyae Won 2011 and she won the first runner-up award. And then, she was chosen by Forever Group for MRTV-4 series and she got opportunity for acting in many series. From 2013 to 2014, she starred in her first series The Sign of Love season 2 and 3 as the character Phyu Sin Shin Thant. In 2014, she was cast in the series Happy Beach. In the same year, she starred in drama series Benefits of Luck. 

In 2015, she starred the main role in thriller-drama series Wit Nyin Shite Than alongside Aung Min Khant, Han Lin Thant, Myat Thu Thu, aired on MRTV-4 on 1 April 2015. Her portrayal of the character Kyal Sin Cho earned praised by fans for her acting performance and character interpretation, and experienced a resurgence of popularity. She then portrayed her role as Saw Kalayar in thriller drama Winkabar San Eain alongside Aung Min Khant, Aung Yay Chan, Phone Shein Khant, Poe Kyar Phyu Khin and Myat Thu Thu. In 2017, she acted in drama Hubris as the character Kyway Kyway alongside Zin Wine, Ye Aung, Han Lin Thant and May Mi Ko Ko. In the same year, she played the main role in drama A Mone Mha The alongside Kyaw Htet Zaw, Kaung Myat San and May Akari Htoo. Then she had to play in films; Shwe Kyar, and Sit Ko Mone Ywae Tite Ke Thi in 2018.

In 2019, she gain increased attention and popularity with her role as Thet Thet Zaw in drama Where There is Love alongside Kaung Myat San, aired on MRTV-4 on 11 March 2019.
The same year, she starred in comedy series Nat A Lo Jo A Ma and drama Love Signal. In 2020, she was cast as Mary in Adin's Challenge.

Filmography

Film (Cinema)
Shwe Kyar (ရွှေကြာ) (2018)
 Sit Ko Mone Ywae Tite Ke Thi (စစ်ကိုမုန်း၍တိုက်ခဲ့သည်) (2018)
 Players (2020)
 Oxygen (TBA)

Film
 A Nya Ta Ya Moe Kaung Kin (အညတရမိုးကောင်းကင်) (2016)
 Nyoe Ywae Nyoo  
 A Phyu Yaung Thet Tant

Television Series

References

External links 

1995 births
Living people
21st-century Burmese actresses
People from Yangon